Eszter Óváry (born 11 October 1972) is a Hungarian gymnast. She competed at the 1988 Summer Olympics and the 1996 Summer Olympics.

Competitive history

References

1972 births
Living people
Hungarian female artistic gymnasts
Olympic gymnasts of Hungary
Gymnasts at the 1988 Summer Olympics
Gymnasts at the 1996 Summer Olympics
Gymnasts from Budapest